Tulsipur is a Sub-Metropolitan City in Dang District of Lumbini Province of Nepal. As per population, it is the district's second most populous city after Ghorahi. It was established in 1992 by merging the former Village development committees
Tulsipur and Amritpur. In 2014, it was expanded and the Village development committees of Urahari, Tarigaun, Pawannagar and Halwar.
At the time of the 2011 Nepal census it had a population of 141,528 people living in 31,243 individual households.

History 
The House of Tulsipur ruled one of the largest Taluqs of Oudh, India, which then included the Dang and Deukhuri Valleys. Therefore, it also counted as one of the Baise Rajya (22 Principalities), a confederation in what became western Nepal.
The Tharu civilization of sukaurakot (at the northern bank of Babai River) is one of the oldest human civilizations which was further extended to the eastern part of the country with the migration of the people of this community towards the east.

Transportation
Dang Airport lies in Old-Tarigaun offering flights to Kathmandu. Roads go north into Salyan District and all the way to Rukum (also called Rapti-Babai Highway) giving its connectivity to Pahadi Lokmarg (Pan Nepal National highway being built up in districts in mountain, parrellal to the Mahendra Highway of Terai), 29 km south to the Mahendra Highway Amiliya in Deukhuri Valley and east to Ghorahi and west to Purandhara all the way connecting to Chhinchu, Surkhet. It is the major  transit point of southern and western dang, Salyan, Rolpa and Rukum districts and serves as the transportation hub of whole rapti zone.

Local Transportation 
The major source of transportation here are buses and jeeps. Nowadays electric auto rikshaw are also running as local transportation in market and town-side area. For the transportation of goods in villages, tractors are rampantly used though trucks are used in the major highways.

Media 
To promote local culture, Tulsipur has currently four FM radio stations. Out of which, Radio Tulsipur 100.2MHZ is the first community radio station. Tulsipur Radio Prakriti 93.4  MHz which is the first environment-friendly community radio station, Radio Hamro Pahuncha - 89  MHz Which is a Community radio Station, Radio Tulsipur - 100.2  MHz which is a private radio station and Radio Sanjhibani-91.0. In addition, there are also two local TV station STV and STN channels which broadcasts local events and news. Along with these, many daily and weekly local newspapers have been publishing.
There is an online news provider channel that is Tulsipur online. 
Some newspapers which are publishing from Tulsipur are Gorakshya daily, Rapti Aawaj daily, Tharkot weekly, etc. All the media in the city is listed below for reference. 

1.Radio Tulsipur 100.2MHZ
2. Radio Hamro Pahuncha - 89 MHz
3. Radio Prakriti 93.4 MHz
4. Radio Sanjhibani-91.0
5. STN Television Channel
6. Dang Television Channel
7. Rapti Aawaj National Daily
8. Gorakshya National Daily
9. Tharkot Weekly
10. Tulsipur Online
11. Merotulsipur
12.www.farakpati.com
13.www.farakpana.com

Education
The, then zonal headquarter of Rapti zone hosts various Government, Public-Private and Private educational institutions. Nepal Sanskrit University, NSU (formerly Mahendra Sanskrit University) is the only Sanskrit university and 2nd oldest University of Nepal which is well known all over Nepal and India for the quality of education it provides promoting the ancient Sanskrit, Vedic Astrology, Nepali literature education in Nepal. Students from all over Nepal, from Mechi to Mahakali use to come for vedic language study. It is mainly famous for its cost-effective, which can even be touted almost free, education in Sanskrit. Its main administrative office is located in Beljhundi whereas campus is in Bijauri. Other prominent institution includes Rapti Babai Campus which provides its facilities in various educational streams up to master's degree. Central Ayurvedic College, Rapti life Care Hospital's Staff Nurse programme is also very famous in the Region.

Similarly, Tulsi Boarding School, which is consistently ranked No. 1 in whole Mid-Western and Far-Western Region for its SLC results and well reputed in Nepal to have been awarded the prize of best School in the Mid-Western Region (best in 15 districts in the region).
there educational Institutions in Tulsipur include Nepal Sanskrit University, Gorkha Higher Secondary School, Hamro Pahunch Secondary School, Divine temple academy, Himal Academy, Chandrodaya Vidya Kunj boarding school, Aadarsh Academy,Rapti Vidya Mandir Secondary School, Novex College and Gyan Jyoti Education Foundation under which many school and college are running.

Healthcare 
In Tulsipur, there is provincial level hospital named Rapti Provincial Hospital.

See also
 Dang District, Nepal
 Ghorahi

References
Citations

Bibliography

External links
UN map of the municipalities of Dang District

Populated places in Dang District, Nepal
Nepal municipalities established in 1992
Submetropolitan municipalities of Nepal